The Zero Gravity Research Facility at the NASA Glenn Research Center in Cleveland, Ohio is a unique facility designed to perform tests in a reduced gravity environment. It has successfully supported research for the United States crewed spacecraft programs and numerous uncrewed projects. The facility uses vertical drop tests in a vacuum chamber to investigate the behavior of components, systems, liquids, gases, and combustion in such circumstances.

The pressure in this vacuum chamber is reduced to 13.3 pascals (1.3 atm) before use. Equipment dropped in the chamber experiences microgravity for about 5.15 seconds before landing in a deceleration cart filled with expanded styrofoam beads; it typically experiences 32g during deceleration, but may range up to 65g.

The service building at the top of the shaft contains a shop area, control room, and a clean room. Assembly, servicing, and balancing of the experiment vehicle are accomplished in the shop area. Tests are conducted from the control room, which contains controls for the "pump down" of the vacuum chamber, the experiment vehicle pre-drop checkout, release and the data retrieval system.

History
The Zero Gravity Research Facility was built in 1966 as part of NASA's Centaur upper-stage rocket development program.  In order to ensure proper firing and functioning of upper-stage rockets, NASA needed to understand the behavior of fluids (importantly, the liquid gases fueling the rockets), in the reduced gravity where they would fire.  The facility was designated a National Historic Landmark in 1985 for its role in the early space program.

References

External links

Zero Gravity Research Facility

Buildings and structures in Cleveland
Glenn Research Center
Buildings and structures completed in 1966
National Historic Landmarks in Ohio
National Register of Historic Places in Cleveland, Ohio
Weightlessness